Vantage College provides interdisciplinary programming, and it is operated by the University of British Columbia exclusively for international students. It charges a program fee that is not funded by the provincial government. It is a first-year program for students that do not meet UBC's English language admission standards.

Controversy

The decision to develop Vantage College attracted criticism from students and faculty at the University of British Columbia for targeting overseas students, being seen as a poor spending decision that fails to significantly benefit the student body at-large.

References

University of British Columbia